Patriarch Cyril VI Tanas, also known as Cyril VI of Antioch (born in 1680, Damascus – died on January 10, 1760), became the first Patriarch of Antioch and All the East, and Alexandria and Jerusalem of the Melkite Greek Catholic Church following the schism of the Greek Orthodox Patriarchate of Antioch in 1724. Cyril re-established full communion with the Catholic Church.

Life
Seraphim Tanas was born in Damascus in 1680, and he was the nephew of Euthymios Saifi, bishop of Sidon. On August 3, 1701, he arrived in Marseille, France, and from 1702 to 1710 he studied in the College of the Propaganda in Rome. Returned in Syria he was ordained priest by his uncle, and he was distinguished for his sermons. He was appointed "Preacher of the Patriarchate of Antioch" by Patriarch Cyril V Zaim.

Like many of his fellow clerics, Seraphim Tanas favored re-establishing full communion with the Roman Catholic Church. He was elected on September 24, 1724, by the Melkites of Damascus as the new Patriarch of Antioch, and was consecrated as Cyril VI in the patriarchal cathedral of Damascus on October 1, 1724, by Neophytos Nasri, eparch of Saidnaya, assisted by Basile Finas, eparch of Baniyas, and by Euthymius Fadel, eparch of Zahle and Forzol. As Cyril was a prominent pro-Westerner, the Orthodox Patriarch Jeremias III of Constantinople felt his authority was challenged. Jeremias declared Cyril's election to be invalid, excommunicated him, and appointed Sylvester of Antioch (1696–1766), a young Greek monk, to the patriarchal See of Antioch. Jeremias consecrated bishop Sylvester in Istanbul on October 8, 1724.

The sultan Ahmed III withdrew the recognition initially conferred on Cyril, who was forced to flee as emissaries of Sylvester arrived from Constantiople with a mandate for his arrest. Cyril took refuge at the Holy Savior Monastery near Sidon, located in modern-day Lebanon. Cyril's safety there was guaranteed by the Shehab emirs. Sylvester unleashed a hard persecution against all who elected or supported Cyril: many people were exiled and all churches were taken by Sylvester's party. This persecution strengthened the faith of the Catholic Melkites who, even without a formal hierarchy, continued to increase in number meeting in secret places and celebrating the Divine Liturgy in homes at night.

Although the populace of Aleppo was mainly pro-Catholic in sentiment, the people initially supported Sylvester. However, Sylvester exacerbated divisions with his heavy-handed rule of the church, and many Melkites chose to acknowledge Cyril VI as patriarch instead. The people united against Sylvester, forcing him to flee Aleppo. The Greek domination over the Byzantine Orthodox Patriarchate of Antioch lasted until 1899.

Notwithstanding the many requests by Cyril for recognition, the Papacy moved with great caution and took six years to recognize Cyril as the legitimate Patriarch of Antioch. The decision was made by Pope Benedict XIII and communicated, almost unofficially, to the Melkites in the synod held on April 25, 1730. From this time onwards, the Melkite Greek Catholic Church has existed separately from and in parallel to the Greek Orthodox Church of Antioch in the Middle East. The pallium, formal recognition of the patriarchal authority, was granted by Rome to Cyril only on February 3, 1744, about twenty years after the 1724 election.

The reasons for this caution and delay by Rome to recognize Cyril as patriarch can be summarized as follows:
 The election of Cyril had been not planned by Rome, and Rome already had Catholic professions of faith by the previous patriarchs Athanasius III Dabbas (in 1687) and Cyril V Zaim (in 1716). Rome didn't want to split the Melkite hierarchy, hoping for a complete union. Only the persecutions by Sylvester and the incoming Greek domination over the Byzantine Orthodox Patriarchate of Antioch left no other choice.
 Cyril followed Euthymios Saifi in introducing many liturgical Latinisations, dividing thus the Catholic Melkites between those who kept the Byzantine rite untouched and those who mixed the rites. For this reason, many Catholic Melkite monks were initially very suspicious of Cyril. As already happened for Euthymios Saifi, the Pope took a strong position against Cyril's latinisations, and his recognition in 1729 was subject to his renouncing any changes to the Byzantine rite and uses. The latinisations, supported by many Latin missionaries (particularly by the Franciscans), continued to be a problem in the Melkite Church until the final position taken by the Pope on December 24, 1743, with the issue of the encyclical Demandatam that put an end to the mix of rites. This same document forbade Latin missionaries to accept the faithful of Byzantine Rites into the Latin Rite.

Cyril VI Tanas summoned synods in 1736, 1751 and 1756 in order to give a structure to the Melkite Church, but without a full success. Cyril had failed to unite two Melkite Basilian Orders, the Basilian Salvatorian Order and Basilian Chouerite Order of Saint John the Baptist. He renounced in 1759 and died on January 10, 1760, leaving a complicated succession.

See also
Patriarch of Antioch
Melkite Greek Catholic Patriarchate of Antioch and All the East
Melkite Greek Catholic Church

Notes

References

External links
Melkite Greek Catholic Patriarchate of Antioch, Alexandria and Jerusalem
L'Église Melkite/The Melkite Church.
Melkite Catholic Web Ring.
Extensive history of the Melkite Church
mb-soft.com
gcatholic.org

1680 births
1760 deaths
Converts to Eastern Catholicism from Eastern Orthodoxy
Former Syrian Orthodox Christians
Melkite Greek Catholic Patriarchs of Antioch
Syrian Melkite Greek Catholics
Eastern Catholic monks
18th-century Christian monks
18th-century Eastern Catholic bishops
People from Damascus